Marchildon is a surname. Notable people with the surname include:

Ananda Marchildon (born 1986), Canadian-Dutch fashion model
Daniel Marchildon, Canadian writer
Emile Marchildon (1888–1967), Canadian ice hockey player
Gilles Marchildon (born 1965), Canadian activist
Leo Marchildon (born 1962), Canadian composer
Micheline Marchildon (born 1974), Canadian actress
Phil Marchildon (1913–1997), Canadian baseball player
Thomas Marchildon (1805–1858), Canadian businessman, farmer and politician